Camp Pathfinder is a boys' Summer camp in Algonquin Provincial Park, Ontario, Canada. The camp is best known for its canoe tripping program. Pathfinder follows a tradition of using wood and canvas canoes. Several other camps in Algonquin and elsewhere follow a similar tradition of tripping with, building and restoring canvas canoes. Pathfinder's canoes are painted a distinctive bright red. The current owners are Glenn Arthurs and Michael Sladden.  Mike Sladden or “Sladds” as many call him, serves as Camp Director.

History
Camp Pathfinder was founded in 1914 by William Bennett and Franklin Gray. In 1922, the camp was sold to Herman J. "Chief" Norton, who became one of Pathfinder's most influential owners. Pathfinder was almost shut down or sold to the Ontario Provincial Government when the government told Norton the lease for the camp (and the others in the park as well) would not be renewed. The government later renewed the lease and the camp (and all the others in the park) remained in operation. Since then, owners or co-owners have included Frank J. Horton, Bill Swift, Roy Thrall, Mac Rand, Glenn Arthurs, and Michael Sladden. Camp Pathfinder is located on Source Lake, in Algonquin Provincial Park, just more than a mile away from Highway 60. Source Lake is an access point to the Algonquin Park canoe route system. There are no campsites on Source Lake. There are, however, a few residential cabins and the camp itself on the lake. 

The camp is located on an island in the lake, commonly referred to as Camp Pathfinder Island or "CPI".  On the opening days of each session, the whole camp meets at the new council ring, and a meeting introducing the camp session is held. This meeting, and other aspects of the camp, have a number of traditions. For example, there is a site believed be the grave of a man known as "Algonquin Joe", and it is traditional to put a fallen leaf on the site. The camp also features a ropes course and climbing walls.

Recently, the camp completed its 100th season.

Canoe tripping

Pathfinder has an extensive canoe tripping program. Trip duration and destination vary by the age group of the campers on the trip. The youngest campers normally stay within the boundaries of Algonquin Park or very close to it. The older campers ('Bears' or 'AA's') venture on longer and more challenging trips with varying destinations. Some trip destinations outside of Algonquin Park have included:

 Albany River
Ashewig River
 Attawapiskat River–James Bay
 Big East River
 Bloodvein River–Lake Winnipeg
 Broadback River
 Coulonge River–Noire River
 Dumoine River
 Harricana River
 Lady Evelyn River–Temagami River
 Lake Superior–Michipicoten River–Missinaibi River–James Bay
 Lake Temagami
 Magnetawan River
 Missinaibi River–Moose River–James Bay
 Missinaibi River–Lake Superior Provincial Park–Sand River–Lake Superior
 Nastapoka river
Mistassibi River
 Rupert River
Severn River–Fawn River–Pipestone River
 White River–Pukaskwa–Lake Superior
Winisk River

References

External links
 
 Canvas Canoe Fleets

Organizations based in Ontario
Camp Pathfinder
Summer camps in Canada
Buildings and structures in Nipissing District
1914 establishments in Ontario